Anthony James Harris (born 26 June 1982) is a New Zealand cricketer who played two first-class matches for the Otago Volts in the State Championship in 2005. He also plays for Central Otago in the Hawke Cup. He was born in Dunedin.

See also
 List of Otago representative cricketers

References
 Cricinfo bio

1982 births
People educated at Trinity Catholic College, Dunedin
Living people
New Zealand cricketers
Otago cricketers